Vanima is a genus of butterflies belonging to the family Nymphalidae.

Species:

Vanima labe 
Vanima lesbia 
Vanima palladia

References

Nymphalidae
Nymphalidae genera
Organisms named after Tolkien and his works